is a village located in Tosa District, Kōchi Prefecture, Japan. , the village had an estimated population of 363 in 214 households and a population density of 3.8 persons per km². Okawa is the least populated municipality in Japan, excluding municipalities affected by the 2011 Fukushima nuclear disaster and municipalities on excluded islands.

Geography 
Ōkawa is located in the Shikoku Mountains in the northern part of Kochi Prefecture, bordering Ehime. The Yoshino River flows through the village from west to east. The former center of the village was submerged due to the completion and flooding of the Sameura Dam, located in nearby Motoyama. Currently, the Komatsu area on the shore of the dam lake has the village office.

Neighbouring municipalities 
Kōchi Prefecture
 Tosa (town)
Ino
Ehime Prefecture
Niihama
Shikokuchūō

Climate
Ōkawa has a Humid subtropical climate (Köppen Cfa) characterized by warm summers and cool winters with light snowfall.  The average annual temperature in Ōkawa is 11.3 °C. The average annual rainfall is 2536 mm with September as the wettest month. The temperatures are highest on average in January, at around 22.4 °C, and lowest in January, at around 0.0 °C.

Demographics
Per Japanese census data, the population of Ōkawa dropped precipitously in the 1960s and 1970s due to submergence the main inhabited portion of the village by the Sameura Dam.

History 
As with all of Kōchi Prefecture, the area of Ōkawa was part of ancient Tosa Province. During the Edo period, the area was part of the holdings of Tosa Domain ruled by the Yamauchi clan from their seat at Kōchi Castle. The village of Ōkawa was established with the creation of the modern municipalities system on October 1, 1889.

Government
Ōkawa has a mayor-council form of government with a directly elected mayor and a unicameral village council of six members. Ōkawa, together with the other municipalities of Tosa District and Nagaoka District, contributes one member to the Kōchi Prefectural Assembly. In terms of national politics, the village is part of Kōchi 1st district of the lower house of the Diet of Japan.

Economy
The major industry in Ōkawa Village is logging; much of the town's mountains have been converted into a cedar tree farm. Additionally, the Shirataki copper mine (白滝鉱山) located in Ōkawa was in operation between 1919 and 1985.

Education
Ōkawa has one public combined elementary/middle school operated by the village government. The village does not have a high school. There is also a nature center which runs summer camps and a study abroad program which allows Japanese youth the opportunity to live in a very remote mountain village for Elementary and/or Junior High School.

Transportation

Railway
Ōkawa has no passenger railway service. The nearest station is Ōsugi Station on the JR Shikoku Dosan Line; however, most passengers travel to Kōchi Station by bus.

Highways 
Ōkawa is not on any national highway.

Local attractions
Ōkawa is regionally famous for its Black Beef cows and the annual Ōkawa Black Beef Festival (大川村謝肉祭 Shanikusai, lit. 'Beef Gratitude Festival') has been known to draw up to a thousand-five hundred people from around Shikoku and Honshu.

There are also a few hiking trails located in the region that reward travelers with beautiful views of Shikoku.

References

External links

Official website 
Shirataki-no-sato (Nature's Kingdom) 

Villages in Kōchi Prefecture